Zoltán Harsányi (born 1 June 1987) is a Slovak footballer who plays for Lipóti SK.

Club career
Harsányi is a striker and has represented Slovakia at under 18 and under 20 level. He initially signed for Bolton on loan from Slovakian side FC Senec until the end of the 2006/2007 season. Bolton had the option to make the deal permanent at the end of the season. On 17 May 2007, Bolton boss Sammy Lee signed Harsányi on a three-year permanent deal after a successful spell in the reserves netting three goals in seven outings. Harsányi came to the club with Ľubomír Michalík. During the Summer of 2007, after an Under 21s game against England, Harsanyi caught the attention of many football fans after scoring a very cheeky penalty by chipping the ball over the head of Manchester City goalkeeper Joe Hart.

On the 11 May 2010, it was announced that Harsányi had been released by Bolton Wanderers without making an appearance for the first team.
In July 2010 Harsány went on trial at NEC Nijmegen in the Netherlands but wasn't offered a contract.

Following his release from Bolton, Harsányi returned to his native Slovakia on a six-month contract with Dunajská Streda.

References

External links

1987 births
Living people
People from Senec, Slovakia
Sportspeople from the Bratislava Region
Hungarians in Slovakia
Slovak footballers
Association football forwards
FC Senec players
Bolton Wanderers F.C. players
FC DAC 1904 Dunajská Streda players
Paykan F.C. players
Pécsi MFC players
Spartak Myjava players
Mezőkövesdi SE footballers
Puskás Akadémia FC players
Nyíregyháza Spartacus FC players
Balmazújvárosi FC players
FC Ajka players
Slovak Super Liga players
Nemzeti Bajnokság I players
Slovak expatriate footballers
Expatriate footballers in England
Expatriate footballers in Iran
Expatriate footballers in Hungary
Slovak expatriate sportspeople in England
Slovak expatriate sportspeople in Hungary
Slovak expatriate sportspeople in Iran